This is a list of High Sheriffs of Hampshire. This title was often given as High Sheriff of the County of Southampton until 1959.

List of High Sheriffs

1070–1096: Hugh de Port 
1105: Henry de Port (son of Hugh)
1129: William de Pont de l'Arche
1130: William de Pont de l'Arche
1150: Thurstan de Popham
1155–1159: Turstin (Turcinus)
1161–1169: Richard, son of Turstin
1170–1173: Hugo de Gundevill
1174–1179: Herudus de Stratoon and Hugo de Gundevill
1180–1188: Geoffrey, son of Azon.
1189: Ogerus, son of Ogerus
1189: Godfrey de Luci
1190: John de Rebez
1191: Willam Briwerre
1192: Ogerus, son of Ogerus
1193–1200: Hugo de Bosco

13th century

14th century

15th century

16th century

17th century

18th century

19th century

20th century

21st century

References
 The history of the worthies of England. Volume 2 by Fuller

The Times

 
Hampshire
Local government in Hampshire
High Sheriff